The high sheriff is the oldest secular office under the Crown and is appointed annually (in March) by the Crown. The High Sheriff of Norfolk was originally the principal law enforcement officer in Norfolk and presided at the assizes and other important county meetings. Most of the responsibilities associated with the post have been transferred elsewhere or are now defunct, so that its functions are now largely ceremonial. There was a single high sheriff serving the two counties of Norfolk and Suffolk until 1576.

Pre 17th century

17th century

18th century

19th century

20th century

21st century

Footnotes

References
 Norfolk Lists by Google books

 
Norfolk
Local government in Norfolk
History of Norfolk
High Sheriffs of Norfolk